

Events

April events 
 April 29 – Ancona–Orte railway (Società per le strade ferrate romane) completed across the Apennine Mountains of the Kingdom of Italy.

May events 
 May 20 – Naples–Salerno railway completed throughout to Salerno in Italy.

June events 
 June 3 – First section of Jonica railway in Italy opens from Reggio Calabria to Lazzaro.
 June 20 – The Great Southern and Western Railway of Ireland introduces the first of its Class 101 0-6-0 goods locomotive from its Inchicore Works, Dublin. This will become by far the most numerous of any class of locomotive to run in Ireland, with 111 built up to 1903, and almost half the class will still be in road service as Class J15 when Córas Iompair Éireann abandons steam at the end of 1962.

July events 
 July 2 - Cholsey and Wallingford Railway in England opens.
 July 27 - The Atlantic and Pacific Railroad in the United States is chartered by a special act of Congress.

August events 
 August 11 – The Kansas Pacific Railroad tracks reach Manhattan, Kansas, where westward progress stalls while a bridge is built across the Big Blue River.
 August 28 – The Danville, Urbana, Bloomington and Pekin Railroad, in Illinois, is incorporated.
 August 29 – The first demonstration runs are held on the Mount Washington Cog Railway, in New Hampshire, as Peppersass, the road's first steam locomotive, hauls a platform of passengers up a 0.1-mile (161 m) section of track.

September events 
 September 1
 Construction of the Randsfjorden Line in Norway is completed to Vikersund.
 The South Eastern Railway of England opens its Cannon Street station (in the City of London), Cannon Street Railway Bridge and Dartford Loop Line.
 September 7 – On the death of Matthias W. Baldwin, Matthew Baird becomes the sole proprietor of Baldwin Locomotive Works.
 September 11 – Bristol and Exeter Railway opens the Chard and Taunton Railway to passenger service as a branch line of the B&ER.

November events 
 November 7 – The Ruse-Varna line, the first railway in Bulgaria, officially opens.

December events 
 December
 Florence–Rome railway (Società delle Ferrovie Livornesi) completes its route via Perugia in Italy.
 The Talyllyn Railway at Tywyn in Wales begins to carry passengers officially (probable date).
 December 15 – Brescia–Cremona railway opens in Italy.

Unknown date events

 The first 2-8-0 with a leading truck is built by the Baldwin Locomotive Works for the Lehigh and Mahanoy Railroad (United States).
 The John Bull, eventually to become the oldest operable steam locomotive in the world, is retired from active service on the Camden and Amboy Railroad.
 The Richmond and Danville Railroad acquires the Piedmont Railroad.
 Construction on the Kansas Pacific Railway reaches Junction City, Kansas, from Kansas City.

Births

January births
 January 31 – William W. Atterbury, president of the Pennsylvania Railroad 1925–1935 (d. 1935)

Deaths

September deaths
 September 7 – Matthias W. Baldwin, American steam locomotive manufacturer and founder of Baldwin Locomotive Works (b. 1795).

Unknown date deaths
 Holmes Hinkley, American steam locomotive manufacturer (b. 1793).

References
 Franklin Gowen. Retrieved March 2, 2005.
 Good, Mike (December 17, 2001), Corporate History: St. Louis – San Francisco Railway Company.  Retrieved July 22, 2005.
 
 
 The New York Times, August 22, 1866.